In Order to Survive is an album by American jazz double bassist William Parker which was recorded live in 1993 and released on the Italian Black Saint label. After the album, Parker groups have been known as In Order To Survive. The cover art was made by Jeff Schlanger, a distinctive artist known for his "MusicWitness" paintings, which are created during live performances.

Reception

In his review for AllMusic, Michael G. Nastos states, "Some tour de force music is found here, which makes one wonder if these performances wouldn't have yielded another CD or three from this band of extraordinary avant-gardists."
The Penguin Guide to Jazz says about the first track that "it is an immensely involving piece that opens up acres of improvisational territory for all the soloists."

Track listing
All compositions by William Parker
 "Testimony of No Future" – 38:47
 "Anast In Crisis Mouth Full of Fresh Cut Flowers" – 6:55
 "Testimony of the Stir Pot" – 20:07 
 "The Square Sun" – 6:13

Personnel
William Parker – bass
Grachan Moncur III - trombone
Rob Brown – alto sax 
Lewis Barnes – trumpet
Cooper-Moore – piano
Denis Charles – drums on 1-3
Jackson Krall – drums on 4

References

1995 live albums
William Parker (musician) albums
Black Saint/Soul Note live albums
Albums recorded at the Knitting Factory